San Martino al Tagliamento is a comune (municipality) in the Province of Pordenone in the Italian region Friuli-Venezia Giulia, located about  northwest of Trieste and about  northeast of Pordenone.

San Martino al Tagliamento borders the following municipalities: Arzene, San Giorgio della Richinvelda, Sedegliano, Valvasone.

References

Cities and towns in Friuli-Venezia Giulia